Kyjovský hrádek, also Horní Karlštejn and Pustý hrádek (German: Oberer Karlstein and Wüstes Schloss) is the name of the ruins of what is supposed to have been a rock castle (Felsenburg) near Kyjov (Khaa) in the Bohemian Switzerland in the Czech Republic. Beam supports and the remnants of rooms carved out of the rock are still visible.

History 
Nothing is known of the history of the castle site. Castle researchers previously thought that the castle was built in early part of the 14th century.

More recent research now doubts, however, that the site was a castle at all. Ceramic finds date the settlement of the area to the 14th century. It could have served as a place that miners used as a place to live and work, where iron ore was processed and smelted. Old names such as Zlatý potok (Goldbach or "Gold Stream") or Železná jáma (Eisengrube or "Iron Pit"), have survived to the present day in the surrounding area, which indicates medieval mining took place here.

See also 
List of castles in the Czech Republic

References

External links 
 Description of Kyjovský hrádek
 Old description of Karlstein

Bohemian Switzerland
Rock castles
Děčín District
Castles in the Ústí nad Labem Region
Ruined castles in the Czech Republic